The Hanukkah Eve windstorm of 2006 was a powerful Pacific Northwest windstorm in the Pacific Northwest region of the United States and southern British Columbia, Canada between December 14, 2006 and December 15, 2006. The storm produced hurricane-force wind gusts and heavy rainfall, causing hundreds of millions of dollars in damage and leaving over 1.8 million residences and businesses without power. Eighteen people were killed, most of whom died of carbon monoxide poisoning in the days following the storm because of improper use of barbecue cookers and generators indoors. The name of the storm was chosen in a contest run by the National Weather Service office in Seattle from about 8,000 entries.

Impact

Washington
The storm left heavy damage across Washington, especially tree damage. The fallen trees knocked down many power lines and closed many roads as well. Seattle-Tacoma International Airport partially lost power, canceling most flights. Flooding was also reported in low-lying areas from the heavy rain.

The electricity grid was hit very hard, as about 1.2 million customers lost power in the state, and Puget Sound Energy reported that more than 75 percent of its circuits were damaged. Municipal utilities also suffered severe damage.  In the Seattle area, several days after the storm hundreds of thousands of families still remained without power and many had to leave their homes and move into hotels or emergency shelters coping with the inclement weather.  Major employers in the area were affected; the power outage forced Microsoft to shut down large portions of its campus in Redmond on December 15.

The Seattle School District and many districts surrounding closed, marking the first time Seattle schools were closed for a weather-related reason other than snow.

It was described as the worst storm to hit the region since the Inauguration Day storm of January 20, 1993.

Deaths
Fourteen people were killed in Western Washington. One of them was 41-year-old voice actress Kate Fleming (aka Anna Fields) who was trapped in a flooded basement in Seattle's Madison Valley. In Grays Harbor County Markus Stickles was killed by a tree that fell into his home in McCleary. In Gig Harbor, Washington, Pritchard Miller and his dog were electrocuted after stepping on a downed power line. In Pierce County, two motorists were hit by falling trees. Eatonville resident Harold Fox, 47, was killed while trying to avoid a fallen tree south of Spanaway. Near McKenna, 37-year-old Roy resident Bonnie Bacus died as the result of a tree falling onto the cab of a truck, in which she was a passenger; her husband, who was driving the truck, died 3 months later. Steven Thielen died in Spanaway as a result of a house fire caused by the use of candles for light.

Eight deaths occurred as a result of carbon monoxide poisoning. Five of those were members of a single Burien family. Adam Butcher, his wife Jackie Harris, and two sons, Jason Shane Butcher, 14 and Raymond Zachary Butcher, 21, died of asphyxiation because of a generator running in a closed garage attached to their home. Another son, Rick Taylor Butcher, 24, died in a hospital on January 20, 2007 as a result of his injuries. Alejandro Nava-Solis of Kirkland, Juan Figueroa-Gomez of Renton, and Shah Fazli of Kenmore were also among the carbon monoxide deaths.

Newspapers
For the first time in 70 years, on December 15 the Seattle Post-Intelligencer was not able to publish copies of its newspaper.  As a result of a power outage at a printing plant in Bothell, the Seattle Times was only able to publish 13,000 copies of its Friday edition.

The following day, both newspapers had to be printed by The News Tribune of Tacoma by virtue of an agreement to use each others' printing presses during emergencies.

For its December 20 edition, the Seattle Times put carbon monoxide warnings on its front page in English, Spanish, Chinese, Vietnamese, Somali, and Russian to get the word out to the immigrant community about the dangers of carbon monoxide in light of recent deaths.

State of Emergency and recovery
On December 18, Washington Governor Christine Gregoire declared a State of Emergency in Western Washington as a result of the damages. On January 11, the Governor requested a federal disaster declaration and on February 14, the declaration was approved by President Bush.

Air quality
In the wake of the storm, the quality of air deteriorated due to the increased use of wood stoves and fireplaces while the air was stagnant.

Contributing factors

Combined with several days of snow and ice later in the month, and continuing rain throughout the first half of December 2006, the ground in the Puget Sound region was extremely waterlogged and loose.

Additionally, large portions of the planted trees in the Seattle metropolitan area were at the end of their lifespan, being some 60 to 70 years of age or more.  To compound this, many tree species had shallow root systems that did not extend past the waterlogged soil.

The result of these factors was that many thousands of large, old trees easily uprooted and tipped over, frequently with tons of mud captured in their roots, and crashed into homes and power lines.

The major tree loss in old growth areas was at borders where more recent logging has occurred.  Forest cover holds together as a group during strong winds and these cuts into the original areas created open edges for trees to be hit horizontally by wind.

Oregon
The high winds also left damage in Oregon. Extensive tree damage was reported, some of which fell on houses or on power lines. More than 350,000 customers lost power at the peak of the storm. Shelters were opened in the coastal regions as a result of the storm damage. Governor Ted Kulongoski requested a federal disaster declaration on January 31, 2007.

Two people were killed due to a house fire in Seaside during a power outage. The severe weather also hampered the rescue efforts of three missing climbers on Mount Hood; one climber was later found dead and the other two are missing and presumed dead. On the Oregon Coast, three sailors hired to sail a catamaran from South Africa to Seattle went missing. The  boat was found overturned on a beach near Lincoln City the morning of December 15. The crew was last seen leaving San Francisco on December 8. The search for the three sailors was called off on the afternoon of December 16.

British Columbia
For British Columbia, the storm followed several others that occurred in the preceding weeks. The most high-profile damage caused by the storm was the breaking and uprooting of around 10,000 trees in Stanley Park in downtown Vancouver.  In addition to Stanley Park, extensive damage was reported to trees around the Lower Mainland, which also took power lines down with them as well as a number of houses, notably on exposed areas of West Vancouver facing west over Howe Sound. BC Ferries service was disrupted along the coast, along with other transit disruption, closed roads, and closed schools. At its peak, BC Hydro reported that over 250,000 customers were without power.

An elderly couple died of asphyxiation as a result of carbon monoxide poisoning in Burnaby.

Total damage
Washington and Oregon suffered a total of $220 million ($279,988,194.44 in 2019) in insured damage according to the Northwest Insurance Council. Washington suffered $170 million in damage and Oregon $50 million. $47 million in damage to public property resulted from the windstorm in Washington state with "several million dollars in damage" to public property in Oregon.

In British Columbia, insured damage was expected to reach $80 million and at Vancouver's Stanley Park repairs were expected to cost $9 million because of numerous fallen trees and damage to the seawall.

Post-storm controversy

Soon after the windstorm, controversy began in Seattle over the drowning death of Kate Fleming as well as the issue of possible problems with storm water drainage which some believe may have led to her death and the flood damage of several homes on the evening of December 14. Seattle received  of rain between 4pm and 5pm, leading to major urban flooding. A city report released on February 27, 2007 stated that sweeping changes were necessary in emergency response services to better mitigate the effects of a natural disaster on the city, such as the establishment of a 311 hot line for non-emergency calls, the installment of emergency generators in every fire station in the city and reconsideration of relying on builders to ensure that storm drains aren't clogged by sediment filters.

The flooding which lead to the death of Fleming was investigated by Denver-based engineering firm CH2M Hill on behalf of the City of Seattle. In its report, released in April 2007, investigators identified several factors, including an unprecedented and unanticipated amount of rainfall, the failure of a nearby retaining wall, and the inadequate design of the drainage system around Fleming's home.

Peak wind gusts
Wind gusts were as high as 70 to 100 mph or more in some locations along the Washington and Oregon coasts, as well as the mountains. Interior locations of Puget Sound and Willamette Valley had gusts in the 50-80 mph+ range.

In addition to the wind, record-breaking rainfall fell in Seattle with nearly an inch in a one-hour period the afternoon of December 14. Such a rainfall event is only expected in Seattle an average of once every 99 years.

See also

Global storm activity of 2006
2006 storms in Vancouver
Great Gale of 1880
Columbus Day Storm of 1962
South Valley Surprise of 2002
Great Coastal Gale of 2007
December 2008 North American snowstorms
January 2012 Pacific Northwest snowstorm

References

External links
KOMO-TV Seattle December Windstorm articles (bottom of page)
Seattle P-I December Windstorm Coverage (various articles and damage images)
Vancouver Sun December Windstorm article (also damage images)
Post-storm analysis by Climatologist Wolf Read

2006 meteorology
Natural disasters in Oregon
Natural disasters in Washington (state)
Natural disasters in British Columbia
2006 natural disasters in the United States
2006 in British Columbia
Pacific Northwest storms
2006 in Oregon
2006 in Washington (state)
December 2006 events in North America
2006 disasters in Canada